Ricky Tjong-a-Tjoe is a former American football defensive end that played for the  San Diego Chargers. He was signed in 2014. He attended Boise State University, and was a communications major. He only played one year of high school football before playing for Boise State.

In July 2022, he signed with the ELF-Team Rhein-Fire in Germany.

References

Living people
American football defensive ends
American sportspeople of Chinese descent
San Diego Chargers players
Boise State Broncos football players
Year of birth missing (living people)